Johan Henrik Marcus Knuth (born 2 April 1976 in Copenhagen) is a Danish politician, who is a member of the Folketing for the Conservative People's Party. He was elected into parliament in the 2015 Danish general election.

Political career
Knuth was elected into parliament for the Venstre party in the 2015 election, where he received 7,351 votes. He was reelected in 2019, where he received 9,523 votes. On 29 November 2019 Knuth decided to leave Venstre and join the Conservative People's Party

Bibliography
Marcus Knuth - ny mand på Borgen (Gyldendal, 2019, co-author)
Soldat og diplomat - mine 3 år i Afghanistan (Gyldendal, 2014)

References

External links 
 Biography on the website of the Danish Parliament (Folketinget)

Living people
1976 births
Politicians from Copenhagen
Danish writers
Conservative People's Party (Denmark) politicians
Venstre (Denmark) politicians
Members of the Folketing 2015–2019
Members of the Folketing 2019–2022